Arachnis aulaea, the  aulaean tiger-moth or tiger moth, is a moth of the family Erebidae. It was described by Carl Geyer in 1837. It is found from southern Arizona in the United States to Guatemala.

Subspecies
Arachnis aulaea aulaea
Arachnis aulaea pompeia Druce, 1894

References

Moths described in 1837
Spilosomina
Moths of North America